The Waltham Forest Council elections, were held on 4 May 2006 in Waltham Forest, England.  The whole council was up for election for the first time since the 2002 election.

Waltham Forest local elections are held every four years, with the next due in 2010.

Following the elections, a coalition agreement was formed between Labour and the Liberal Democrats.

Eligibility 

All locally registered electors (British, Irish, Commonwealth and European Union citizens) who were aged 18 or over on Thursday, 4 May 2006 were entitled to vote in the local elections. Those who were temporarily away from their ordinary address (for example, away working, on holiday, in student accommodation or in hospital) were also entitled to vote in the local elections, although those who had moved abroad and registered as overseas electors cannot vote in the local elections. It is possible to register to vote at more than one address (such as a university student who had a term-time address and lives at home during holidays) at the discretion of the local Electoral Register Office, but it remains an offence to vote more than once in the same local government election.

Composition before election

Election result

|}

Results by ward

The ward results listed below are based on the changes from the 2002 elections, not taking into account any mid-term by-elections or party defections.

References

2006
2006 London Borough council elections